Events from the year 1429 in France

Incumbents
 Monarch – Charles VII

Events
 12 February – Battle of the Herrings during the Hundred Years War
 29 April – Joan of Arc arrives to relieve the siege of Orléans.
 7 May – The Tourelles, the last English siege fortification at Orléans, falls. Joan of Arc becomes the hero of the battle by returning, wounded, to lead the final charge.
 8 May – The English army abandons the siege of Orléans
 18 June – At the Battle of Patay the English are beaten forcing them to withdraw from the Loire Valley
 17 July – Charles VII is crowned as King of France at the traditional site of Reims
 8 September – Joan of Arc leads a failed attempt to capture Paris
 Unknown – The future Louis XI becomes Dauphin of France

Deaths
 12 July – Jean Gerson, scholar (born 1363)
 Unknown – John Stewart of Darnley, Scottish-born Nobleman and soldier and French ally (born 1380)

References

1420s in France